Salma is an Arabic feminine name that means "peace". It comes from the Arabic word Salam.

People so named include:

 Salma bint Amr, great-grandmother of the Islamic prophet Muhammad
 Salma bint Umays, a sahaba of the prophet Muhammad
 Salma Bennani (born 1978), birth name of Princess Lalla Salma of Morocco, queen consort of Morocco
 Salma Samar Damluji (born 1954), Iraqi British architect
 Salma Hale (1787–1866), American politician
 Salma Hany Ibrahim Ahmed (born 1996), Egyptian squash player
 Salma Hareb (born 1965), Emirati chief executive officer
 Salma Hayek (born 1966), Mexican-born American actress
 Salma Islam (born 1955), Bangladeshi lawyer, journalist and politician
 Salma Khadra Jayyusi (born 1926), Palestinian writer
 Salma Kikwete (born 1963), Tanzanian first lady
 Salma Maoulidi, Tanzanian women's rights activist
 Salma Mumin, 21st century Ghanaian actress
 Salma Paralluelo (born 2003), Spanish footballer and sprinter
 Salma Rachid (born 1994), Moroccan singer
 Salma Shabana (born 1976), Egyptian squash player
 Salma Solaun (born 2005), Spanish rhythmic gymnast 
 Salma Sultana, Bangladeshi veterinarian, entrepreneur and researcher
 Salma Yaqoob (born 1971), British politician
 Salma Zahid, Canadian 21st century politician

English-language feminine given names
Arabic feminine given names
English feminine given names
Iranian feminine given names
Spanish feminine given names
Portuguese feminine given names
Bosnian feminine given names